Sven Erik Coster (born 2 December 1978, in Leiden) is a sailor from the Netherlands. Coster represented his country for the first time at the 2004 Summer Olympics in Athens. With his brother Kalle Coster as crew Coster took 6th place as helmsman in the Dutch Men's 470. Coster's second Olympic appearance was during the 2008 Olympics in Qingdao again as helmsman in the 470 and his brother as crew, Coster took the 4th place. Also with Kalle as crew in the 470 Coster helmed the Dutch 470 at the 2012 Olympics in Weymouth. The brothers finished on the 12th place.

Sven Coster also represented The Netherlands during the 2008 Vintage Yachting Games in Medemblik as crew in the Soling with helmsman Steven Bakker and fellow crewmembers Dick Coster and Joost Houweling. The team took silver.

Sven Coster is the son of Dick Coster.

Professional life
Coster is International Sales Manager at Hall Spars.

Further reading

2004 Olympics (Athens)

2008 Olympics (Qingdao)

2012 Olympics (Weymouth)

References

External Link
 
 
 

Living people
1978 births
Sportspeople from Leiden
Dutch male sailors (sport)
Sailors at the 2004 Summer Olympics – 470
Sailors at the 2008 Summer Olympics – 470
Sailors at the 2012 Summer Olympics – 470
Olympic sailors of the Netherlands